T7 or T-7 may refer to:

Biology
 Thoracic vertebra 7
 Thoracic spinal nerve 7
 T7 phage, a virus used in the study of biological systems
 T7 DNA Helicase, a hexameric motor protein 
 T7 RNA polymerase, an RNA polymerase that catalyzes the formation of RNA

Transport
 Île-de-France tramway Line 7
 Olympic Park line, a service of Sydney Trains
 Twin Jet's IATA airline code
 T7 Bristol–Chepstow, a bus route in the United Kingdom

Vehicles
 T-7 (rocket), China's first sounding rocket
 Boeing T-7 Red Hawk, an American advanced jet trainer aircraft
 Fuji T-7, a Japanese primary trainer aircraft
 Yugoslav torpedo boat T7
 T7 Armored Car, a prototype vehicle for the US Army
 T7 Combat Car, a prototype vehicle for the US Army
 T-7 Navigator or Beechcraft Model 18, a trainer aircraft used by the United States armed forces
 T7, a model of the OS T1000 train of the Oslo Metro
 LSWR T7 class, an experimental 4-2-2-0 steam locomotive built in 1897

Other uses
 2C-T-7, a hallucinogenic phenethylamine
 T7, television station in Kosovo
 Tekken 7, a 2015 fighting game
 T-Seven or Judith Hildebrandt, a singer and former member of Mr. President
 A tornado intensity rating on the TORRO scale